Sportfreunde Baumberg is a German amateur football club from the neighbourhood of Baumberg in Monheim am Rhein, North Rhine-Westphalia. Founded in 1962, the team plays in the Oberliga Niederrhein in the fifth tier of the German football league system.

History
As the winners of the 2013 Lower Rhine Cup, the club played in the 2013–14 DFB-Pokal. In the first round on 3 August, it lost 4–1 at home to FC Ingolstadt 04 of the 2. Bundesliga.

After three seasons in the tier five Oberliga Niederrhein the club was relegated to the Landesliga Niederrhein (tier six) at the end of the 2014–15 season but bounced back immediately with a league championship and promotion there.

Honours
The club's honours:
 Lower Rhine Cup
 Winners: 2013
 Landesliga Niederrhein 2
 Champions: 2006, 2010
 Landesliga Niederrhein 1
 Champions: 2016

References

External links
 Official club site

Football clubs in Germany
Football clubs in North Rhine-Westphalia
1962 establishments in West Germany
Association football clubs established in 1962